Tani Kahn, known professionally as Legwurk, is a Canadian singer, guitarist, bassist, key player, producer, and songwriter living in Brooklyn, NY. She has been playing guitar, bass, and keys in Still Woozy's band on their recent tours. Her music has been categorized as indie pop, synth-pop, dance-pop, bedroom pop, and chillwave. Legwurk began releasing solo music in 2020, but she has been writing songs since she was 12. She is an openly transgender and lesbian woman.

Career 
Kahn began playing music and writing music when she was young, teaching herself guitar. She also studied music at University of California, Santa Cruz where she met Still Woozy. Prior to her involvement in the indie pop scene, Legwurk had made some folk music. The project of Legwurk began when she wanted to make music that was more palatable and relatable for a general audience. 

For a few years before the COVID-19 pandemic, Kahn was touring with Still Woozy as an opener as well as playing guitar, bass, and keys for the band. Legwurk started to release her own singles in 2020 after the COVID-19 pandemic hit, and Still Woozy was no longer touring. Her first single "Home" came out May 7, 2020. She self-released her debut EP I Have a Bad Memory in June 2022. Legwurk produced and wrote each song on the EP. She has stated that creating the EP was like therapy for her, and she produces music from her own home. Legwurk toured with Still Woozy throughout 2022 which included playing Coachella. She also played some solo shows in 2022 across the U.S.

Personal life 
Legwurk lived in many different places around the world while she was growing up and now lives in Brooklyn, NY. She is a transgender woman advocates on transgender issues both in and outside of her music. Most of her songs are about the transgender experience, and she believes it is important to use music to uplift transgender voices. She has a dog named Wilbur who is very important to her.

Discography

Extended plays

Singles

References 

Canadian singer-songwriters
Canadian guitarists